Thomas Alan Abercrombie (22 January 1951 – 11 April 2019)  was a writer and associate professor of anthropology at New York University. He is the author of Pathways of Memory and Power, a book which explores the ethnography and history of the Andeans.

Abercrombie was also a recipient of a Guggenheim Fellowship for 2004–2005.

Bibliography 

Abercrombie, Thomas A. (2018). Passing to América: Antonio (Née Maria) Yta’s Transgressive, Transatlantic Life in the Twilight of the Spanish Empire. University Park: Pennsylvania State University Press.

References

External links 
NYU profile

1951 births
2019 deaths
American anthropologists
New York University faculty